The discography of Brotha Lynch Hung, an American hip hop artist consists of nine solo studio albums, six collaborative studio albums, one EP's, five solo compilation albums, four collaborative compilations and three mixtapes. His music has been released on record labels Black Market Records, BP Metro, Siccmade Music, Madesicc Music and Strange Music.

Albums

Studio albums

Collaborative albums

Extended plays

Compilations

Mixtapes

Guest appearances

Music videos

Music videos  notes
1. A Director's Cut version of this video was released in 2011.

References

Discographies of American artists
Hip hop discographies